This is a list of all the military units in Finnish Defense Forces.

List of Military Units

In total there are 3 HQ's, 3 Readiness Brigades, 3 Armed/ Normal Military Academies, 2 Fighter Wings, 1 Naval Fleet and various other units.

See also 
 List of former Finnish military units

References 

 https://puolustusvoimat.fi/en/units

Lists of military units and formations of Finland